Jón Pétursson (born 4 May 1967) is an Icelandic sailor. He competed in the 470 event at the 1984 Summer Olympics.

References

External links
 

1967 births
Living people
Icelandic male sailors (sport)
Olympic sailors of Iceland
Sailors at the 1984 Summer Olympics – 470
Place of birth missing (living people)